In mathematics, the classification of the finite simple groups is a result of group theory stating that every finite simple group is either cyclic, or alternating, or it belongs to a broad infinite class called the groups of Lie type, or else it is one of twenty-six or twenty-seven exceptions, called sporadic. The proof consists of tens of thousands of pages in several hundred journal articles written by about 100 authors, published mostly between 1955 and 2004.

Simple groups can be seen as the basic building blocks of all finite groups, reminiscent of the way the prime numbers are the basic building blocks of the natural numbers. The Jordan–Hölder theorem is a more precise way of stating this fact about finite groups. However, a significant difference from  integer factorization is that such "building blocks" do not necessarily determine a unique group, since there might be many non-isomorphic groups with the same composition series or, put in another way, the extension problem does not have a unique solution.

Gorenstein (d.1992), Lyons, and Solomon are gradually publishing a simplified and revised version of the proof.

Statement of the classification theorem

The classification theorem has applications in many branches of mathematics, as questions about the structure of finite groups (and their action on other mathematical objects) can sometimes be reduced to questions about finite simple groups. Thanks to the classification theorem, such questions can sometimes be answered by checking each family of simple groups and each sporadic group.

Daniel Gorenstein announced in 1983 that the finite simple groups had all been classified, but this was premature as he had been misinformed about the proof of the classification of quasithin groups. The completed proof of the classification was announced by  after Aschbacher and Smith published a 1221-page proof for the missing quasithin case.

Overview of the proof of the classification theorem
 wrote two volumes outlining the low rank and odd characteristic part of the proof, and 
wrote a 3rd volume covering the remaining characteristic 2 case. The proof can be broken up into several major pieces as follows:

Groups of small 2-rank
The simple groups of low 2-rank are mostly groups of Lie type of small rank over fields of odd characteristic, together with five alternating and seven characteristic 2 type and nine sporadic groups.

The simple groups of small 2-rank include:
Groups of 2-rank 0, in other words groups of odd order, which are all solvable by the Feit–Thompson theorem.
Groups of 2-rank 1. The Sylow 2-subgroups are either cyclic, which is easy to handle using the transfer map, or generalized quaternion, which are handled with the Brauer–Suzuki theorem: in particular there are no simple groups of 2-rank 1 except for the cyclic group of order two. 
Groups of 2-rank 2. Alperin showed that the Sylow subgroup must be dihedral, quasidihedral, wreathed, or a Sylow 2-subgroup of U3(4). The first case was done by the Gorenstein–Walter theorem which showed that the only simple groups are isomorphic to L2(q) for q odd or A7, the second and third cases were done by the Alperin–Brauer–Gorenstein theorem which implies that the only simple groups are isomorphic to L3(q) or U3(q) for q odd or M11, and the last case was done by Lyons who showed that U3(4) is the only simple possibility.
Groups of sectional 2-rank at most 4, classified by the Gorenstein–Harada theorem.
The classification of groups of small 2-rank, especially ranks at most 2, makes heavy use of ordinary and modular character theory, which is almost never directly used elsewhere in the classification.

All groups not of small 2 rank can be split into two major classes: groups of component type and groups of characteristic 2 type. This is because if a group has sectional 2-rank at least 5 then MacWilliams showed that its Sylow 2-subgroups are connected, and the balance theorem implies that any simple group with connected Sylow 2-subgroups is either of component type or characteristic 2 type. (For groups of low 2-rank the proof of this breaks down, because theorems such as the signalizer functor theorem only work for groups with elementary abelian subgroups of rank at least 3.)

Groups of component type
A group is said to be of component type if for some centralizer C of an involution, C/O(C) has a component (where O(C) is the core of C, the maximal normal subgroup of odd order).
These are more or less the groups of Lie type of odd characteristic of large rank, and alternating groups, together with some sporadic groups.
A major step in this case is to eliminate the obstruction of the core of an involution. This is accomplished by the B-theorem, which states that every component of C/O(C) is the image of a component of C.

The idea is that these groups have a centralizer of an involution with a component that is a smaller quasisimple group, which can be assumed to be already known by induction. So to classify these groups one takes every central extension of every known finite simple group, and finds all simple groups with a centralizer of involution with this as a component. This gives a rather large number of different cases to check: there are not only 26 sporadic groups and 16 families of groups of Lie type and the alternating groups, but also many of the groups of small rank or over small fields behave differently from the general case and have to be treated separately, and the groups of Lie type of even and odd characteristic are also quite different.

Groups of characteristic 2 type

A group is of characteristic 2 type if the generalized Fitting subgroup F*(Y) of every 2-local subgroup Y is a 2-group.
As the name suggests these are roughly the groups of Lie type over fields of characteristic 2, plus a handful of others that are alternating or sporadic or of odd characteristic. Their classification is divided into the small and large rank cases, where the rank is the largest rank of an odd abelian subgroup normalizing a nontrivial 2-subgroup, which is often (but not always) the same as the rank of a Cartan subalgebra when the group is a group of Lie type in characteristic 2.

The rank 1 groups are the thin groups, classified by Aschbacher, and the rank 2 ones are the notorious quasithin groups, classified by Aschbacher and Smith. These correspond roughly to groups of Lie type of ranks 1 or 2 over fields of characteristic 2.

Groups of rank at least 3 are further subdivided into 3 classes by the trichotomy theorem, proved by Aschbacher for rank 3 and by Gorenstein and Lyons for rank at least 4.
The three classes are groups of GF(2) type (classified mainly by Timmesfeld), groups of "standard type" for some odd prime (classified by the Gilman–Griess theorem and work by several others), and groups of uniqueness type, where a result of Aschbacher implies that there are no simple groups.
The general higher rank case consists mostly of the groups of Lie type over fields of characteristic 2 of rank at least 3 or 4.

Existence and uniqueness of the simple groups

The main part of the classification produces a characterization of each simple group. It is then necessary to check that there exists a simple group for each characterization and that it is unique. This gives a large number of separate problems; for example, the original proofs of existence and uniqueness of the monster group totaled about 200 pages, and the identification of the Ree groups by Thompson and Bombieri was one of the hardest parts of the classification. Many of the existence proofs and some of the uniqueness proofs for the sporadic groups originally used computer calculations, most of which have since been replaced by shorter hand proofs.

History of the proof

Gorenstein's program
In 1972  announced a program for completing the classification of finite simple groups, consisting of the following 16 steps:
 Groups of low 2-rank. This was essentially done by Gorenstein and Harada, who classified the groups with sectional 2-rank at most 4. Most of the cases of 2-rank at most 2 had been done by the time Gorenstein announced his program.
 The semisimplicity of 2-layers. The problem is to prove that the 2-layer of the centralizer of an involution in a simple group is semisimple.
 Standard form in odd characteristic. If a group has an involution with a 2-component that is a group of Lie type of odd characteristic, the goal is to show that it has a centralizer of involution in "standard form" meaning that a centralizer of involution has a component that is of Lie type in odd characteristic and also has a centralizer of 2-rank 1.
 Classification of groups of odd type. The problem is to show that if a group has a centralizer of involution in "standard form" then it is a group of Lie type of odd characteristic. This was solved by Aschbacher's classical involution theorem.
 Quasi-standard form
 Central involutions
 Classification of alternating groups.
 Some sporadic groups
 Thin groups. The simple thin finite groups, those with 2-local p-rank at most 1 for odd primes p, were classified by Aschbacher in 1978
 Groups with a strongly p-embedded subgroup for p odd
 The signalizer functor method for odd primes. The main problem is to prove a signalizer functor theorem for nonsolvable signalizer functors. This was solved by McBride in 1982.
 Groups of characteristic p type. This is the problem of groups with a strongly p-embedded 2-local subgroup with p odd, which was handled by Aschbacher.
 Quasithin groups. A quasithin group is one whose 2-local subgroups have p-rank at most 2 for all odd primes p, and the problem is to classify the simple ones of characteristic 2 type. This was completed by Aschbacher and Smith in 2004.
 Groups of low 2-local 3-rank. This was essentially solved by Aschbacher's trichotomy theorem for groups with e(G)=3. The main change is that 2-local 3-rank is replaced by 2-local p-rank for odd primes.
 Centralizers of 3-elements in standard form. This was essentially done by the Trichotomy theorem.
 Classification of simple groups of characteristic 2 type. This was handled by the Gilman–Griess theorem, with 3-elements replaced by p-elements for odd primes.

Timeline of the proof

The date given is usually the publication date of the complete proof of a result, which is sometimes several years later than the proof or first announcement of the result, so some of the items appear in the "wrong" order.

Second-generation classification
The proof of the theorem, as it stood around 1985 or so, can be called first generation. Because of the extreme length of the first generation proof, much effort has been devoted to finding a simpler proof, called a second-generation classification proof. This effort, called "revisionism", was originally led by Daniel Gorenstein.

, nine volumes of the second generation proof have been published (Gorenstein, Lyons & Solomon 1994, 1996, 1998, 1999, 2002, 2005, 2018a, 2018b, 2021). In 2012 Solomon estimated that the project would need another 5 volumes, but said that progress on them was slow. It is estimated that the new proof will eventually fill approximately 5,000 pages. (This length stems in part from the second generation proof being written in a more relaxed style.) However, with the publication of volume 9 of the GLS series, and including the Aschbacher–Smith contribution, this estimate was already reached, with several more volumes still in preparation (the rest of what was originally intended for volume 9, plus projected volumes 10 and 11). Aschbacher and Smith wrote their two volumes devoted to the quasithin case in such a way that those volumes can be part of the second generation proof.

Gorenstein and his collaborators have given several reasons why a simpler proof is possible.
 The most important thing is that the correct, final statement of the theorem is now known. Simpler techniques can be applied that are known to be adequate for the types of groups we know to be finite simple. In contrast, those who worked on the first generation proof did not know how many sporadic groups there were, and in fact some of the sporadic groups (e.g., the Janko groups) were discovered while proving other cases of the classification theorem. As a result, many of the pieces of the theorem were proved using techniques that were overly general.
Because the conclusion was unknown, the first generation proof consists of many stand-alone theorems, dealing with important special cases. Much of the work of proving these theorems was devoted to the analysis of numerous special cases. Given a larger, orchestrated proof, dealing with many of these special cases can be postponed until the most powerful assumptions can be applied. The price paid under this revised strategy is that these first generation theorems no longer have comparatively short proofs, but instead rely on the complete classification.
Many first generation theorems overlap, and so divide the possible cases in inefficient ways. As a result, families and subfamilies of finite simple groups were identified multiple times. The revised proof eliminates these redundancies by relying on a different subdivision of cases.
Finite group theorists have more experience at this sort of exercise, and have new techniques at their disposal.

 has called the work on the classification problem by Ulrich Meierfrankenfeld, Bernd Stellmacher, Gernot Stroth, and a few others, a third generation program. One goal of this is to treat all groups in characteristic 2 uniformly using the amalgam method.

Length of proof

Gorenstein has discussed some of the reasons why there might not be a short proof of the classification similar to the classification of compact Lie groups.

The most obvious reason is that the list of simple groups is quite complicated: with 26 sporadic groups there are likely to be many special cases that have to be considered in any proof. So far no one has yet found a clean uniform description of the finite simple groups similar to the parameterization of the compact Lie groups by Dynkin diagrams.
Atiyah and others have suggested that the classification ought to be simplified by constructing some geometric object that the groups act on and then classifying these geometric structures. The problem is that no one has been able to suggest an easy way to find such a geometric structure associated with a simple group. In some sense, the classification does work by finding geometric structures such as BN-pairs, but this only comes at the end of a very long and difficult analysis of the structure of a finite simple group.
Another suggestion for simplifying the proof is to make greater use of representation theory. The problem here is that representation theory seems to require very tight control over the subgroups of a group in order to work well. For groups of small rank, one has such control and representation theory works very well, but for groups of larger rank no-one has succeeded in using it to simplify the classification. In the early days of the classification, there was a considerable effort made to use representation theory, but this never achieved much success in the higher rank case.

Consequences of the classification

This section lists some results that have been proved using the classification of finite simple groups.

The Schreier conjecture
The Signalizer functor theorem
The B conjecture
The Schur–Zassenhaus theorem for all groups (though this only uses the Feit–Thompson theorem).
A transitive permutation group on a finite set with more than 1 element has a fixed-point-free element of prime power order.
The classification of 2-transitive permutation groups.
The classification of rank 3 permutation groups.
The Sims conjecture

See also

O'Nan–Scott theorem

Notes

Citations

References
 

 

 Daniel Gorenstein (1985), "The Enormous Theorem", Scientific American, December 1, 1985, vol. 253, no. 6, pp. 104–115.

 Mark Ronan, Symmetry and the Monster, Oxford University Press, 2006. (Concise introduction for lay reader)
Marcus du Sautoy, Finding Moonshine, Fourth Estate, 2008,  (another introduction for the lay reader)
 Ron Solomon (1995) "On Finite Simple Groups and their Classification," Notices of the American Mathematical Society. (Not too technical and good on history)
  – article won Levi L. Conant prize for exposition

External links
 ATLAS of Finite Group Representations. Searchable database of representations and other data for many finite simple groups.
 Elwes, Richard, "An enormous theorem: the classification of finite simple groups," Plus Magazine, Issue 41, December 2006. For laypeople.
 Madore, David (2003) Orders of nonabelian simple groups.  Includes a list of all nonabelian simple groups up to order 1010.
 In what sense is the classification of all finite groups “impossible”?
 
  (Last updated on March 2023)

Group theory

Finite groups
Theorems in algebra
2004 in science
History of mathematics
Mathematical classification systems